Michigan City Municipal Airport  is a public use airport located three nautical miles (6 km) east of the central business district of Michigan City, in LaPorte County, Indiana, United States. The airport is publicly owned by the Michigan City Board of Aviation Commissioners.

Facilities and aircraft 
It has one paved runway designated 2/20 with an asphalt surface measuring 4,100 by 75 feet (1,250 x 23 m).

For the 12-month period ending December 31, 2005, the airport had 7,783 aircraft operations, an average of 21 per day: 90% general aviation and 10% air taxi. At that time there were 50 aircraft based at this airport: 78% single-engine, 14% multi-engine, 2% jet, 2% helicopter and 4% glider.

Awards 
Michigan City Municipal Airport received the 2007 Airport of the Year Award. This award is given jointly by the Aviation Association of Indiana (AAI), the Aircraft Owners and Pilots Association (AOPA), the Federal Aviation Administration (FAA), the Indiana Department of Transportation – Office of Aviation, and aviation industry sponsors to annually recognize an outstanding airport.

References

External links 
 Michigan City Municipal Airport, official site
 Aerial photo, from Indiana Department of Transportation
 Aerial photo as of 11 April 1998 from USGS The National Map
 
 

Airports in Indiana
Northwest Indiana
Transportation buildings and structures in LaPorte County, Indiana